Kenneth Offit (born February 19, 1955) is an American cancer geneticist and oncologist. He is currently Chief of the Clinical Genetics Service and the Robert and Kate Niehaus Chair in Inherited Cancer Genomics at Memorial Sloan Kettering Cancer Center. Offit is also a member of the Program in Cancer Biology and Genetics at the Sloan-Kettering Institute, Professor of Medicine and Healthcare Policy and Research at Weill Cornell Medical College, and a member of both the Board of Scientific Counselors of the National Cancer Institute and the Evaluation of Genomic Applications in Practice and Prevention working group of the U.S. Centers for Disease Control. 

Offit has been widely recognized for his discoveries with respect to the genetic bases of breast, colon, and lymphoid cancers. In 2016, he was elected as a Member of the National Academy of Medicine. In 2018, he was named a Fellow of the American Society of Clinical Oncology. In 2021, he was named a fellow of the American Association for the Advancement of Science.

Research
In 1996, after the discovery of the BRCA2 gene, Offit and his research group successfully identified the most common mutation on the gene associated with breast and ovarian cancer among individuals of Ashkenazi Jewish ancestry. Offit's group would go on to discover or describe recurrent mutations causing increased risk for colon and prostate cancer, and, in 2013 and 2015, they described two genetic syndromes of inherited childhood lymphoblastic leukemia.

Offit was honored for his contributions to the prevention and management of cancer with the 2013 American Society of Clinical Oncology-American Cancer Society Award and Lecture. He is also the author of a textbook, Clinical Cancer Genetics: Risk Counseling and Management, which received an award in Medical Sciences from the Association of American Publishers.

In 2018, Offit helped launch the BRCA Founder Outreach Study, which provides free testing for three mutations for all insured people over the age of 25 with at least one grandparent of Ashkenazi heritage.

Life
Offit was born in New York City on February 19, 1955, to Sidney Offit and Dr. Avodah K. Offit (née Komito). Offit attended the Browning School and then Princeton University, where he was chairman of Tiger Magazine and later elected to the University Board of Trustees. After graduating magna cum laude from Princeton in 1977, he completed both an M.D. at Harvard Medical School and an M.P.H. at the Harvard School of Public Health. In 1984, Offit married Emily Sonnenblick. Sonnenblick is a radiologist at Mount Sinai Hospital and the daughter of cardiologist Edmund Sonnenblick. One of their daughters, Anna Offit, is an assistant professor of law at Southern Methodist University.

References

American oncologists
American geneticists
1955 births
Living people
Princeton University alumni
Harvard Medical School alumni
Browning School alumni
Memorial Sloan Kettering Cancer Center physicians
Harvard School of Public Health alumni
Members of the National Academy of Medicine